Bande Originale Du Livre is an EP by Mano Negra, released in 1994.

Track listing

Personnel
 Manu Chao – lead vocals, guitar
 Antoine Chao – trumpet, vocals
 Santiago Casariego – drums, vocals
 Philippe Teboul – percussion, vocals
 Daniel Jamet – lead guitar, vocals
 Olivier Dahan – bass, vocals
 Thomas Darnal – keyboards, vocals
 Pierre "Krøpöl" Gauthé – trombone, vocals

References

External links
 

1994 EPs
Mano Negra (band) albums